C. Radhakrishnan (born 15 February 1939) is an Indian writer and film director in Malayalam-language from Kerala, India.

Life

Chakkupurayil Radhakrishnan was born on 15 February 1939 in Chamravattam (a village in Tirur) in Malappuram district, which was then a part of the Madras Presidency of British India), to Parappur Madathil Madhavan Nair and Chakkupurayil Janaki Amma. He heard from his grandparents that Thunchaththu Ezhuthachan was an ancestor in his lineage, and this and other details of the information imparted to him formed the basis for creation of one of his works: the biography of Thunchaththu Ramanujan Ezhuthachan titled Theekkadal Kadanhu Thirumadhuram.

Radhakrishnan wrote his first novel Nizhalppadukal at the age of 21  in 1959 while pursuing his post graduate degree. The book was initially published serially in a magazine and later published by Current Books in 1962. The book became a runaway hit and was the winner of Kerala Sahitya Akademi Award in 1962.

In July 2014, Radhakrishnan was awarded the Moortidevi Award for the year 2013 for his novel Theekkadal Kadanhu Thirumadhuram. He was conferred the Ezhuthachan Puraskaram for the year 2016. Other literary recognitions include the Mathrubhumi Literary Award in 2015, K. P. Kesava Menon Memorial Award in 2016, the Madhava Mudra, Nalappadan Award and Thrikkavu Devi Puraskaram.

Radhakrishnan was editor of the Malayalam magazine Piravi published by the School of Bhagavad Gita. He was the former chief editor of Madhyamam Daily from 16 August 1999 to 1 September 2001.

Bibliography

Novel

Story

Poetry

Drama

Children's literature

Non-fiction

Collections

Works in English

Scientific literature

References

External links
 Official website
 Works of C. Radhakrishnan
  www.thehindu.com
  www.cinemaofmalayalam.net
 

1939 births
Living people
Indian male novelists
Malayalam-language writers
Malayalam novelists
Recipients of the Sahitya Akademi Award in Malayalam
Recipients of the Kerala Sahitya Akademi Award
Malayalam film directors
Government Victoria College, Palakkad alumni
Film directors from Kerala
20th-century Indian novelists
Novelists from Kerala
People from Malappuram district
Screenwriters from Kerala
20th-century Indian dramatists and playwrights
20th-century Indian film directors
20th-century Indian male writers
Recipients of the Moortidevi Award
Recipients of the Abu Dhabi Sakthi Award